Dame Wendy Mitchell  (1932–1999) was a British nurse, midwife, politician and public servant.

Biography
Wendy Dell was educated at Heathfield House High School, Cardiff (later merged into St Illtyd's Catholic High School), then quaified as a nurse at Cardiff Royal Infirmary, and midwifery at St David's Hospital and Queen's Institute, Cardiff. In 1963 she married Anthony Mitchell. As Wendy Mitchell she continued her nursing career for the rest of her life. She also became involved in politics and was a local councillor in Greenwich for 20 years (1974–94). She was president of the Conservative Party 1993–94 and chaired the Conservative Party conference in 1993.

Mitchell was appointed an OBE in 1986 for political and public service, and advanced to DBE in 1992, again for political and public service.

References

1932 births
1999 deaths
British nurses
British midwives
Conservative Party (UK) politicians
Dames Commander of the Order of the British Empire
Officers of the Order of the British Empire